The 2016 season is SCG Muangthong United's 8th season in the Thai Premier League since 2009. The club enters the season as the Thai Premier League Champion, and will participate in the Thai League, FA Cup, League Cup, Kor Royal Cup, Toyota Premier Cup and the AFC Champions League.

Foreign Players

Kit 
Manufacturer: Grand Sport Group, Main sponsor: Siam Cement, 2nd sponsor: Yamaha Corporation, 3rd sponsor: Singha, 4th sponsor: I-Mobile, 5th sponsor: Herbalife, 6th sponsor: Sponsor Beverage Brand, 7th sponsor: Coca-Cola

Pre-season and friendlies

Kor Royal Cup
Coke Charity Cup. It's a match between Buriram United the 2015 Toyota Thai Premier League's champions VS. SCG Muangthong United the 2015 Toyota Thai Premier League's runners-up at Suphachalasai Stadium, Bangkok, Thailand.

Thai League

AFC Champions League

Thai FA Cup
Chang FA Cup

Thai League Cup
Toyota League Cup

Squad appearances statistics

Squad goals statistics

Transfers
First Thai footballer's market is opening on December 27, 2015 to January 28, 2016
Second Thai footballer's market is opening on June 3, 2016 to June 30, 2016

In

Out

Loan in

Loan out

Notes

External links

MTU
2016